North Country Reform Temple-Ner Tamid is a Reform synagogue in Glen Cove, New York. Initially founded in 1956, the temple has employed two facilities in Glen Cove, the first burning down in 1982. Following that, the congregation was sheltered by the local Congregation Tifereth Israel and St. Paul's Episcopal Church for three years until the dedication of the current synagogue in 1985.

Since 1996, the congregation has been led by Rabbi Dr. Janet B. Liss.

History

In 1955, the nearest Reform synagogue to Glen Cove, NY was Roslyn's Temple Sinai. Alvin Rubin, then-rabbi of the Roslyn congregation, recommended to 30 of the 40 families in his congregation to meet at the household of congregant Paul Ressler to discuss planning a new Reform congregation. Assisted by the Union for Reform Judaism (URJ), at that time called the Union of American Hebrew Congregations, the congregation held its first independent service at Friends Academy in January 1956. That March, Kal Macklin, who was among the original congregants who met at the Ressler household, was elected as president of the congregation. At the time of the High Holidays, the congregation numbered 100 and was offered housing from Methodist and Masonic churches, and the local Neighborhood House.

In May 1957, the congregation moved to its first self-owned temple. In 1974, Laurence Kotok became the congregation's fourth rabbi. In 1978, the congregation elected its first woman president, Susan Cort. That same year, the sanctuary was enlarged.  In 1982, the synagogue's kitchen was renovated at a cost of $25,000. On February 17, a nineteen-year-old janitor accidentally set fire to the synagogue while attempting to soften wax contained by plastic with fire. Attempting to extinguish the blaze resulted in an explosion which destroyed the building's framework. Despite the efforts of firefighters, the entire building was destroyed, with the exception of a single column, which stands at the front of the new building. The janitor falsified evidence to convince police vandals were to blame for the blaze, but ended up pleading guilty to arson two months later.

With the displaced assembly now sheltered by a local congregation and church, the towns surrounding Glen Cove held a large fundraiser that provided enough to fund the construction of a new synagogue. Groundbreaking began August 21, 1983 and the synagogue was finally completed on February 10, 1985, being dedicated with "Ner Tamid" affixed to the title that May. Rabbi Kotok continued as rabbi until 1996, when he accepted a position with Temple B'rith Kodesh, the oldest and largest Reform congregation in Rochester, New York, from which he retired in 2014. Kotok was replaced by the current rabbi, Dr. Janet B. Liss, marking both the first woman and member of the LGBT community to ever head the congregation. Liss had previously served as the rabbi for the Reform congregation Temple Kol Ami in Plantation, Florida. As of 2017 more than 325 families belong to the congregation, and the Temple hosts a K-5 religious school, a URJ-affiliated youth group, and a sisterhood.

Gallery

References

Synagogues in Nassau County, New York
Reform synagogues in New York (state)
Destroyed synagogues
Synagogues completed in 1985
Jewish organizations established in 1956
1956 establishments in New York (state)